Rajah Lontok (Baybayin: ᜎᜓᜈ᜔ᜆᜓᜃ᜔) (r. 1430–1450) was the husband and co-regent of Dayang Kalangitan of the indianized Kingdom of Tondo and Namayan.

See also

History of the Philippines
Kingdom of Tondo
Kingdom of Maynila

References

Filipino paramount rulers
Filipino datus, rajas and sultans
15th-century monarchs in Asia
Year of birth missing
Year of death missing